Duchess of Idaho is a musical romantic comedy produced in 1950 by Metro-Goldwyn-Mayer. Directed by Robert Z. Leonard, it was the fourth film pairing  Esther Williams and Van Johnson. It was filmed at the MGM Studios lot and exteriors shot in Sun Valley, Idaho.

Plot
Christine Riverton Duncan (Esther Williams) attempts to play matchmaker for her lovelorn friend Ellen (Paula Raymond) by pursuing Douglas J. Morrissen, Jr. (John Lund), the man Ellen loves, all the way to Idaho. There, Christine decides to play a joke on Douglas. After boarding his train to Sun Valley, Christine wins the man's affections and then shocks him with hints that she expects a commitment. Once she's in Sun Valley, however, things become problematic when Christine falls in love with hotel bandleader Dick Layne (Van Johnson). During her time in Sun Valley, Christine wins the title of "Duchess of Idaho" in a dance contest.

Cast
 Esther Williams as Christine Riverton Duncan
 Van Johnson as Dick Layn
 John Lund as Douglas J. Morrissen Jr.
 Paula Raymond as Ellen Hallet
 Mel Tormé as Cyril, the Bellhop
 Lena Horne as herself – Cameo appearance
 Eleanor Powell as herself – Cameo appearance
 Clinton Sundberg as Matson 
 Connie Haines as Peggy Elliot 
 Amanda Blake as Linda Kinston 
 Tommy Farrell as Chuck 
 Sig Arno as Monsieur Le Blanche 
 Dick Simmons as Alec I. Collins 
 Red Skelton as himself – Cameo appearance
 The Jubalaires in a cameo appearance

Production
In November 1947, it was announced Esther Williams would appear in a film set in Sun Valley, The Duchess of Idaho. Dorothy Cooper and Jerry Davis were assigned the script. Robert Cummings was originally mentioned as a potential male lead but the role went to Van Johnson, who had made three films with Williams before. A film unit left MGM on 21 August 1948 to shoot second unit at Sun Valley. Ricardo Montalbán was announced as the third lead. Filming was pushed back when Williams fell pregnant. Then it was announced Cummings and Janet Leigh would support Williams and Johnson. These roles would be played by John Lund (borrowed from Paramount) and Paula Raymond.

In her autobiography, Million Dollar Mermaid, Williams called this a "re-hash of the Esther Williams formula: the mismatched lovers plot. It was enough to give one a case of cinematic deja vu."

This marked Eleanor Powell's first film appearance in six years as well as her last film appearance. Williams reported that Powell had practiced her cameo's routine until her feet bled, claiming that it had to be perfect.

Lena Horne's contract with MGM also ended with this film, though she would make several more MGM musical appearances later in the decade.

Soundtrack
 Let's Choo Choo Choo to Idaho; Written by Al Rinker and Floyd Huddleston; Sung by Van Johnson, Connie Haines and The Jubilaires
 You Can't Do Wrong Doin' Right; Written by Al Rinker and Floyd Huddleston; Sung by Van Johnson and Connie Haines
 Of All Things; Written by Al Rinker and Floyd Huddleston; Sung by Connie Haines
 Baby Come Out of the Clouds; Written by Henry Nemo and Lee Pearl; Sung by Lena Horne

Deleted performances
Several musical numbers filmed for the movie were cut from the theatrical release. The deleted songs were: 
 "Warm Hands, Cold Heart", sung by Mel Tormé
 "You Won't Forget Me", sung by Lena Horne
 "You Do Something to Me", the Cole Porter standard, also sung by Lena Horne
The first two performances would later surface on a special DVD packaged in a 2004 box set of the That's Entertainment! films.

Box office
According to MGM records the film earned $2,851,000 domestically and $1,385,000 foreign, making the studio a profit of $921,000.

Critical reception
Cue magazine found the film to be "a big, beautiful bore. The comedy is rapid and the pace is sleepy."

The Billboard reviewed that the film "can thank its lucky songs for saving it form a fate worse than boredom. Technicolor extravaganza's glitter and glamor proves too cumbersome for its flimsy, implausible plot".

References

External links
 
 
 
 

1950 films
1950 musical comedy films
American musical comedy films
American romantic comedy films
American romantic musical films
Films directed by Robert Z. Leonard
Films scored by Georgie Stoll
Films set in Sun Valley, Idaho
Films shot in Sun Valley, Idaho
Metro-Goldwyn-Mayer films
American skiing films
Swimming films
1950s English-language films
1950s American films